The Shahsevan, are a branch of the Turkic Oghuz groups, a sub-ethnic group of Azerbaijani people, located primarily in Iran and Republic of Azerbaijan. The name Shahsevan means "adherents of the Shah, a people who are loving Shah, devoted to the Shah". The core of this sub-ethnic group is a tribe that migrated under the leadership of Yunsur Pasha from the territory of the Ottoman Empire to the territory of the Iranian lands. After negotiations with Shah Abbas and receiving the name "Shahseven", the tribe settled in the area of the Arax, Kura and Ardabil rivers, choosing Yunsur Pasha as the founder of the new tribal dynasty. It is mentioned in historical texts that during the reign of the Safavid Shah Abbas I, the Qizilbash tribes, which previously formed the basis of the Safavid army, rebelled against the Shah. To protect the territories and his own power, the shah decided to assemble a new army, consisting of the non-military Turkic population of various regions, which included Asia Minor and the Two Rivers. This group was called the "Shahseven" - people of the Shah / loyal to the Shah / lovers of the Shah. The Shahseven managed to suppress uprisings and protect the borders of the territories from Uzbek conquerors. They were also defenders of Persia from the attacks of Turkey and Russia.

Numbers and Settlement 
Today, most of the Shahsevens settled in wooden houses, called "takhta gapu", which were lined up along the route of nomads, which, in turn, was necessary for feeding livestock and finding pastures. Such camps were widespread near Ardabil, Bilesavar, Parsabad, as well as some areas of Ijrud, Zendjan, Sorab, Kaleybar and the province of East Azerbaijan. Also some Shahseven people live in the Central Province of the Iran, in Tehran, Qazvin and Hamadan.

In the 18th century, after the conquest of the Salyans in 1759, Fatali-khan resettled several Shahsevens to the Quba Khanate from the Mugan steppe. One of the sources reports the following about the Shahsevens: "Shahseven Tavabi Magomed-khan... with his Shahseven people settled from Ardabil with the permission of Fatali Khan in Shabran and Muskur, making the following villages: Baindurli, Chakhmakhly, Hisun, Ciğatay (also Dzhigatay), Hacılı (also Hacılar), Kormandali, Gebeli, Ustajalilli, Keuladaeli and others".

According to the data of the late 19th century, the Shahsevens, along with Azerbaijanis (indicated in the source as "Tatars") were listed separately, and the number of male Shahsevens in the Baku Governorate was as follows:

 Baku Uyezd- 194 males. (0,5%)
 Javad Uyezd - 1,356 males. (4%)
 Lankaran Uyezd - 462 males. (1%).

The Shahsevens of Baku Governorate are natives of Iranian Azerbaijan (from Ardabil) and moved to Baku Governorate, at the end of the 19th century.

They are credited with founding the Absheron village of Ahmedli. Also, some of the inhabitants of another Baku village, named Hovsan, were considered to be shahsevens.

History 
The formation of this group began in the 16th century by the Safavid Shah Abbas I, who, in order to weaken the influence of the Qızılbash tribal leaders, began to create a special guard of members of the Qızılbash tribal association, called "shahseven" (Azerbaijani: Şahsevən - literal meaning of word is the Shah lovers). The basis of the Shahseven was made up of seven Qızılbash tribes. The head of the Shahseven tribe Nazarali-khan was the founder of the Ardabil Khanate.

They speak eastern (mugan) dialects of the Azerbaijani language. They have common roots with the Qashqais.

Ethnography 
The tribal structure of the Shahsevens has a large number of different institutions, arranged in descending order. So the largest unit of the tribal structure will be the ethnic group, then the tribe, clan, gubak, ube and family. The gubak in the Shahseven tribes is the main tribal unit that forms the basis of the clan. Typically, gubaks consist of 20-30 families, which are engaged in driving a common herd from pasture to pasture. The gubaks themselves can be collectively referred to as a small separate tribe.

Ube also consists of several families with a joint household, but it is a smaller unit in relation to the gubak.

Some sources say that the Shahsevens have 11 tribes and 90 Ube. According to another division, this tribal union can be considered as 32 Mesginshahr tribes and 13 Ardabil tribes, which, in turn, are divided into smaller units.

The ethnographic group is managed by the Ilbeks. Ilbek is responsible for maintaining order and collecting taxes. In addition, a bek appointed by the Ilbeks is in charge of the local administration of the tribe. Aksakals (white-bearded) are the embodiment of the political, economic, religious and social elite.

Culture 
The traditional occupation of the Shahsevens was nomadic cattle breeding (breeding of sheep, cattle as a draft force, camels and horses). In the summer they roamed in the Sabalan mountains , in the winter in the Mugan steppe. From the end of the 19th century, the Shahsevens began the transition to sedentary agriculture.

The traditional dwelling of the Shahsevens is tents.

Men's clothing - white or blue shirt, brown woolen trousers , Circassian coat , lamb hat, pistons . In winter, the Shahsevens wear long-sleeved lamb coats. They shave their heads, leaving curls on their temples, grow beards.

Women's costume - blue shirt, harem sirwal , arkhalig , blue chador , woolen stockings, chuvyaki , gold and silver jewelry. The woman's head is tied with a scarf.

Traditional food - pilaf, chowder, mutton, dairy products.

The Shahsevens preserve the tribal division and some pre-Muslim customs (including funeral ones).

The existence of rich pastures, as well as land suitable for breeding cattle and small ruminants, in conjunction with a climate suitable for animal husbandry, determined the main occupation of the Shahsevens. Thus, the basis of the economic component of the tribes is the breeding of cows, buffaloes, sheep, camels and goats

Women of the Shahseven tribes are engaged in weaving kilim, jajim, horse blankets and khurjibs, which also plays the role of economic support for the tribe

See also 
 Shahsevan rug
 Iranian Turks
 Iranian Azerbaijanis
Qashqai people

References

External links 
 

Ethnic groups in Azerbaijan
Ethnic groups in Iran
Qom Province
Qazvin Province
Zanjan Province
Azerbaijani tribes
Ardabil Province